David Rice Hedgley Jr. (born January 21, 1937) is an American computer scientist and mathematician who has made major contributions to the field of computer graphics. One of his contributions was the solution of the hidden-line problem in computer 3D graphics.

References

Living people
American computer scientists
1937 births